The Golden Lotus Award for Best Documentary is an award for documentary films.

Award winners and nominees

2000s

2009 (1st)

2010s

2010 (2nd)

2011 (3rd)

2012 (4th)

2013 (5th)

2014 (6th)

2016 (8th)

References

External links

Golden Lotus Awards
Awards established in 2009
2009 establishments in Macau
Documentary film awards